John Hennessey or Hennessy may refer to:

Religious figures
John Hennessy (bishop) (1825–1900), American Roman Catholic archbishop of Dubuque, Iowa
John Joseph Hennessy (1847–1920), Irish-born prelate of the Roman Catholic Church in Kansas

Sportspeople
John F. Hennessey (1900–1981), American tennis player
John Hennessey (rugby league), Welsh rugby league footballer
John Hennessy (American football) (born 1955), American football player
Jackie Hennessy (born 1940), Irish footballer

Others
John Pope Hennessy (1834–1891), Governor of Hong Kong, grandfather of John Pope-Hennessy
John David Hennessey (1847–1935), English-Australian author, newspaper editor and Protestant minister
John A. Hennessy (1859–1951), American special investigator
John W. Hennessey Jr. (1925–2018), American academic and educator
John Pope-Hennessy (1913–1994), British art historian and museum director, grandson of John Pope Hennessy
John J. Hennessey (1921–2001), American four-star army general
John L. Hennessy (born 1952), American computer scientist; former president of Stanford University
John M. Hennessy (born 1936), American financier and philanthropist

See also
Jack Hennessy (disambiguation)
Hennessey (disambiguation)